Dyckia gracilis is a plant species in the genus Dyckia. This species is native to the Santa Cruz region of Bolivia and the Chaco region of Argentina.

References

gracilis
Flora of Bolivia
Flora of Argentina
Plants described in 1896